Siarhei Uladzimiravich Platonau (born December 12, 1990) is a Belarusian long distance runner.

Achievements

References

1990 births
Living people
Belarusian male long-distance runners